The Play-offs of the 1993 Federation Cup Asia/Oceania Zone were the final stages of the Zonal Competition involving teams from Asia and Oceania. Those that qualified for this stage placed first and second in their respective pools.

The six teams were then randomly paired up to compete in three play-off ties, with the winners qualifying for the World Group.

Indonesia vs. Singapore

China vs. Sri Lanka

New Zealand vs. Thailand

 ,  and  advanced to the World Group.

See also
Fed Cup structure

References

External links
 Fed Cup website

1993 Federation Cup Asia/Oceania Zone